Music Is Just a Bunch of Notes is an album by blues artists "Spider" John Koerner and Willie and the Bumblebees, released in 1972. It was reissued in 2010 by Nero's Neptune Records along with a movie Koerner made titled The Secret of Sleep.

"Macalester Don't Stop Now 10-Mar-72" was recorded live by Koerner, Dave Ray, and Bonnie Raitt at Macalester College in St. Paul, Minnesota on March 10, 1972. "Waiting for Go with Normal Dub" was recorded live in Minneapolis, Minnesota outside of Tom Olson's house.

The album had a plain white cover that was rubber stamped by hand, making each one unique. This included one that said "also on side two: Everybody's Going For the Money", which had been left off of the label. Early copies had a serial number alá the Beatles' White Album.  Later copies came in a plain white cover with a central cut-out so the record label could be read; a large label was glued to the top reading "Spider John Koerner, Tom Olson and/Willie Murphy   with The Bumblebees  SJL5872."

Track listing

Side one
 "Macalester Don't Stop Now 10-Mar-72" – :23
 "Ramble, Tumble" (John Koerner) – 3:19
 "Don't Terrify Me" (Koerner) – 3:04
 "Be Careful" (Koerner) – 4:53
 "Waiting for Go with Normal Dub" (Tom Olson) – 5:30

Side two
 "Cindy's #" (Palmer)
 "Everybody's Goin' For The Money" (Koerner)
 "Skipper And His Wife" (Koerner)
 "Thief River Falls" (Koerner, Willie Murphy)
 "Mr. Image" (Olson)
 "Taking Time" (Koerner)
 "The Wall" (Olson)

Personnel
John Koerner – guitar, vocals
Willie Murphy – bass, piano, vocals
Dave Ray – vocals on "The Wall"
Tom Olson – vocals ("Waiting for Go with Normal Dub", "Mr. Image", "The Wall")
John Beach – piano
Stephen Bradley – drums
Gene Hoffman – tenor saxophone
Maurice Jaycox – alto and baritone saxophone
Voyle Harris – trumpet
Mary Du Shane – violin
Sandy Herforth – violin
Alan Weisman – harp ("Thief River Falls")
Dave Morton – vocals
Betty Brenner – vocals
Liz Thorson – vocals
Bibi Bathos – vocals
Stevi Beck – vocals

References

External links
John Koerner discography
Nero's Neptune Records

1972 albums
John Koerner albums
Albums produced by Dave Ray